Kamal Sidhu (born February 24, 1968) is a Canadian model, VJ, TV anchor and actress. She won the Miss India–Canada title in 1991, she has a successful career as presenter and show host.

Early life
Sidhu was born in an Indian Sikh family who lived in the Philippines, where she stayed till the age of six. Later they moved to Canada, where she was raised and educated. She has a university degree in pre-medical. She is fluent in Tagalog, English, Punjabi and French.

Career
Prior to being in TV shows and in the modeling industry, Sidhu was an athlete, training to compete at the Olympic Games in Atlanta, representing Canada in the heptathlon. An unfortunate injury abruptly ended her dreams and made her to pursue other avenues. She was advised by a cousin, and consequently entered the Miss India-Canada contest in 1991, to which she won first runner-up.

In India, she started her career with Channel V and later MTV Asia. She also worked with channel AXN in this same country. One of the first few 'Indian' VJs, Sidhu and her Canadian accent were hugely popular with the teen population, many imitating her style of dress, hair and talking. She hosted an adult show on sex lives on Zoom TV and anchored an environmental series called EarthPulse on National Geographic Channel. She presented the Rio Games in August 2016 on Star Sports channel in her brief return to where it all started - STAR TV NETWORK.

Personal life
Kamal Sidhu was in a relationship with erstwhile MTV and Channel V VJ - Danny McGill during the 1990s.
She is married to Nico Ghogavala owner of B.A.R company.

Filmography

References

External links

 

1971 births
Living people
Canadian film actresses
Canadian female models
Canadian VJs (media personalities)
Indian emigrants to Canada
Canadian people of Punjabi descent
Canadian actresses of Indian descent
Female models of Indian descent
Canadian expatriate actresses in India
Actresses in Hindi cinema
Canadian Sikhs
Canadian heptathletes
20th-century Canadian actresses
21st-century Canadian actresses